Barauni Junction railway station (station code BJU), is a railway station in the Sonpur division of East Central Railway. Barauni Junction is located in Barauni city in Begusarai district in the Indian state of Bihar.

History 
In February 2012, The Indian Railways had planned to set up a  Railway Station Development Corporation (RSDC) that will work on improving the major railway stations including Muzaffarpur Junction by building and developing  Restaurants, shopping areas and food plaza for commercial business and improving passenger amenities.

Facilities 
The major facilities available are waiting rooms, computerized reservation facility and vehicle parking. The vehicles are allowed to enter the station premises. The station also has STD/ISD/PCO telephone booth, toilets, tea stall, fruit stall, dairy stall, meal stall and book stall.

Platforms 

Barauni Junction has nine platforms. The platforms are interconnected by two foot overbridges. Another foot overbridge will be built at this station.
Platform no.1 will again rebuilt here soon.

Electric Loco Shed, Barauni 
Electric Loco Shed, Barauni is a engine shed performing locomotive maintenance and repair facility for electric locomotives of the Indian Railways, located at Barauni , Begusarai district of the East Central Railway zone in Bihar, India. It falls under the Sonpur railway division .It is Bihar's first electric locomotive maintenance shed.

Prime Minister Narendra Modi inaugurated the locomotive shed in September 2019. It can accommodate 2,500 locomotives. At inauguration its initial capacity was 55 locomotives, with currently is 106 locomotives.

Nearest airports 
The nearest airports to Barauni Junction are
Darbhanga Airport, Darbhanga , 112 kilometres (70 mi)
Lok Nayak Jayaprakash Airport, Patna 
Gaya International Airport

References

External links 
 Official website of the Begusarai district

Railway stations in Begusarai district
Railway junction stations in Bihar
Sonpur railway division

Transport in Barauni